Christopher Rafael Morel (born June 24, 1999) is a Dominican professional baseball utility player for the Chicago Cubs of Major League Baseball (MLB). He made his MLB debut in 2022.

Professional career
Morel signed with the Chicago Cubs as an international free agent in 2015. In 2017, he was assigned to the Cubs team of the Dominican Summer League. In 61 games, he batted .220 with 49 hits, 6 doubles, 2 triples, 7 home runs, and 23 stolen bases. He spent the 2018 season with A- Eugene Emeralds, and Rookie League AZL Cubs. In 54 games, he batted .216 with 44 hits, 8 doubles and 3 home runs. He spent the 2019 season with the A level South Bend Cubs. In 73 games, he batted .284, with 73 hits, 15 doubles, 7 triples, and 6 home runs. 

He did not play in a game in 2020 due to the cancellation of the minor league season because of the COVID-19 pandemic. The Cubs added Morel to their 40-man roster to protect him from the Rule 5 draft on November 20, 2020. He spent the 2021 season with the Double-A Tennessee Smokies, and Triple-A Iowa Cubs. In 111 games, he batted .223 with 90 hits, 18 doubles, 5 triples, and a career high 18 home runs.

Morel started the 2022 season with Double-A Tennessee, but was recalled to the major leagues on May 17. Morel made his major league debut later that day, and hit a home run in his first career at-bat during a 7-0 win over the Pittsburgh Pirates.

See also
List of Major League Baseball players with a home run in their first major league at bat
 List of Major League Baseball players from the Dominican Republic

References

External links

1999 births
Living people
Águilas Cibaeñas players
Arizona League Cubs players
Chicago Cubs players
Dominican Republic expatriate baseball players in the United States
Dominican Summer League Cubs players
Eugene Emeralds players
Iowa Cubs players
Major League Baseball infielders
Major League Baseball outfielders
Major League Baseball players from the Dominican Republic
People from Santiago de los Caballeros
South Bend Cubs players
Tennessee Smokies players